German submarine U-134 was a Type VIIC U-boat of Nazi Germany's Kriegsmarine during World War II. She was laid down on 6 September 1940 by Bremer Vulkan in Bremen-Vegesack as yard number 13 and commissioned on 26 July 1941.

Design
Being a German Type VIIC submarine, U-134 was longer than the Type VIIB submarines. It had a displacement of  when at the surface and  while submerged. She had two shafts and two  propellers.

U-134 was fitted with five  torpedo tubes (four fitted at the bow and one at the stern), fourteen torpedoes, one  SK C/35 naval gun, 220 rounds, and a  C/30 anti-aircraft gun. The boat had a complement of between forty-four and sixty.

Service history

Patrols off Norway
On her first patrol off the northern coast of Norway, on 9 December 1941, U-134, under the command of Kapitänleutnant Rudolf Schendel, attacked a four-ship convoy and sank the 2,185 GRT German merchant ship . Schendel was later notified by BdU (U-boat Headquarters) that he had attacked a German convoy. An OKM (Naval High Command) investigation blamed U-134s commander for the incident, but also noted that he had not been informed of the positions of the German ships in the area.

On her second patrol off the coast of Norway, on 2 January 1942, U-134 sank the British cargo ship Waziristan of Convoy PQ 7a, carrying 3,700 tons of military supplies, including 410 Ford trucks, for Russia from New York.

Transfer to France
U-134 had no success during her next three patrols, before being transferred from the base at Kirkenes, Norway, to La Pallice, France, in mid-1942.

Her next patrol, the sixth, in June–September 1942 took her to the Gulf coast of the United States, but she made no attacks.

SS Scapa Flow
On her seventh patrol to the central Atlantic, on 14 November 1942, U-134 sank the 4,827 GRT Panamanian steamship  that carried manganese ore, latex and baled rubber. At 4:58 pm the steamer, under the Master, Samuel Newbold Mace, was hit on the portside under the bridge and at the third hatch by two torpedoes and sank in one minute at position  in the Atlantic Ocean. She had been located at 11:37 am on a route where attacks were prohibited. The U-boat first obtained permission to attack. 23 survivors escaped in a damaged lifeboat, having two rafts and a tin of bandages. The master and chief engineer of the steamer had drowned. The 47 crew members and 13 United States Navy armed guards on board had no time to launch the four needed lifeboats. Only a metal boat, acquired from the SS John Carter Rose and four rafts floated. 25 crew members and six armed guards were lost. The survivors transferred the next morning into the boat with the supplies, but one armed guard died.

For her eighth patrol command of U-134 passed to Oberleutnant zur See Hans-Günther Brosin, but during 58 days in the North Atlantic, from 6 March to 2 May 1943, she made no attacks.

Blimp K-74
On 10 June 1943 U-134 sailed once more to the Florida coast on her ninth and final patrol, where the American , Goodyear-built ZPK-class K-74 blimp became the only airship to be shot down in the war. K-74, launched from Naval Air Station Richmond, Florida, detected U-134 on radar in the Straits of Florida at 23:40 on 18 July 1943. United States Navy doctrine required blimps to stay out of range of surfaced submarines and guide aircraft or ships to attack. The blimp's pilot, Lieutenant Nelson C. Grills, USNR, disregarded this doctrine in an attempt to prevent U-134 from reaching a tanker and freighter ahead of the submarine. K-74 was hit by U-134s 20mm cannon fire during its 55-knot approach. K-74 returned 100 rounds of .50 caliber (12.7 mm) fire before the machine gun was unable to depress sufficiently as the blimp passed over U-134 on its bombing run. A common misconception is that K-74s Mark XVII depth charges failed to release as the blimp passed over U-134, however this is known to be false as the sub received below-the-waterline damage consistent with a depth bomb. The airship lost control and went nose-up, quickly rose to an altitude of 1,000 feet, and after jettisoning external fuel tanks to regain control slowly fell tail-first into the sea. None of the ten-man crew was injured and all moved away from K-74 to avoid anticipated depth charge detonations when it sank. K-74 remained afloat for eight hours, however, and U-134 pulled part of the wreckage aboard for photographs and evaluation. All but one of K-74s crew were rescued the following day by the submarine chaser  and the destroyer . Aviation Machinist's Mate second class Isadore Stessel drowned after being attacked by a shark, just minutes before rescue, and became the only United States Navy airshipman to die as a result of enemy action.

Sunk
All 48 men on board died. U-134 had passed the images of K-74 to another U-boat prior to being sunk. The United States Navy was unaware K-74 had been boarded until the photographs were discovered in 1958.

Wolfpacks
U-134 took part in seven wolfpacks, namely:
 Ulan (25 December 1941 – 19 January 1942) 
 Umbau (4 – 16 February 1942) 
 Endrass (12 – 17 June 1942) 
 Streitaxt (20 October - 2 November 1942) 
 Stürmer (11 – 20 March 1943) 
 Seeteufel (21 – 30 March 1943) 
 Meise (15 – 22 April 1943)

Summary of raiding history

References

Bibliography

External links

German Type VIIC submarines
U-boats commissioned in 1941
U-boats sunk in 1943
World War II submarines of Germany
1941 ships
World War II shipwrecks in the Atlantic Ocean
Ships built in Bremen (state)
U-boats sunk by British aircraft
U-boats sunk by depth charges
Ships lost with all hands
Maritime incidents in August 1943